Hellraiser: Inferno (also known as Hellraiser V: Inferno) is a 2000 American horror film. It is the fifth installment in the Hellraiser series, and the first Hellraiser film to be released direct-to-video. It was directed by Scott Derrickson, in his feature-length directorial debut, and released on October 3, 2000. The film follows Joseph Thorne, a corrupt detective who discovers the Lemarchand's box at a crime scene, which results in his life gradually unraveling.

Plot 
Joseph Thorne is a corrupt Denver police detective who regularly indulges in drug use and infidelity during the course of duty. At the scene of what appears to be a ritual murder, Thorne discovers a strange puzzle box, which he takes home in order to indulge his fascination with puzzles. After solving the box, Thorne begins to experience bizarre hallucinations, such as being seduced by a pair of mutilated women and being chased by a creature with no eyes or legs. Thorne also makes a connection between the murder and a killer known as  "The Engineer", who is suspected of having kidnapped a child. Thorne goes in search of the Engineer, who in turn begins murdering Thorne's friends and associates, leaving behind one of the child's fingers at every crime scene.

While undergoing therapy for his hallucinations, Thorne's psychiatrist reveals himself to be "Pinhead", the leader of a group of entities known as the Cenobites, who use the puzzle box as a portal between their realm and the mortal realm. Pinhead informs Thorne that he has in fact been in the Cenobite's realm since opening the box, where they have been subjecting him to psychological torture for the various cruelties he has inflicted on others: The Engineer is a manifestation of Thorne's own cruelty, while the child is a personification of Thorne's innocence, which he has slowly been killing through corruption, hedonism, and violence. As hooked chains appear and begin to ensnare Thorne, Pinhead informs him that he will be subjected to an eternity of torment for his sins.

Cast 
 Craig Sheffer as Detective Joseph Thorne
 Nicholas Turturro as Detective Tony Nenonen
 James Remar as Dr. Paul Gregory
 Doug Bradley as Pinhead
 Nicholas Sadler as Bernie
 Noelle Evans as Melanie Thorne
 Lindsay Taylor as Chloe
 Matt George as Leon Gaultier
 Michael Shamus Wiles as Mr. Parmagi
 Sasha Barrese as Daphne Sharp
 Kathryn Joosten as Mary Thorne
 Jessica Elliot as Young Mary Thorne
 Carmen Argenziano as Captain
 J B Gaynor as Young Joseph Thorne

Production 
Clive Barker confirmed in an online appearance on AOL in 1996 after the American release of Hellraiser: Bloodline that Dimension Films intended to make a fifth installment in the series, while the film's screenwriter Peter Atkins claimed that there had been reshoots to leave room for at least two more sequels. One concept was a project called Hellraiser: Hellfire, a pitch by Stephen Jones and Michael Marshall Smith in which Kirsty Cotton would face a plot by a cult to unleash the Leviathan and the Cenobites into the real world, with a climax involving a large Lament Configuration enclosing London. The pitch was rejected due to budgetary concerns after the film was opted to be released direct-to-video. Although Barker was briefly in negotiations to return as executive producer in 1999 he was ultimately dropped from the production due to creative disagreements with the studio, and was barred from the providing any sort of assistance on the film. Bob and Harvey Weinstein ultimately commissioned a script by Paul Harris Boardman and Scott Derrickson. After giving Derrickson $10,000 to direct a single scene from the film, they hired him as the director. Doug Bradley has since claimed that Boardman's and Derrickson's script was originally not intended as a Hellraiser sequel, and that it was rewritten to provide connections to the series. However, the claim is disputed by Derrickson, who has stated that the script was pitched as a Hellraiser sequel and was always meant to be one. A retrospective review of the film by Bloody Disgusting also dismissed claims about the script's origins as "rumors".

Release

Home media
The film was released on VHS and DVD on October 3, 2000 by Buena Vista Home Entertainment. The film debuted on the Blu-ray format for the first time on May 15, 2011 in a double feature with its predecessor Hellraiser: Bloodline (1996) by Echo Bridge Entertainment.

Reception
The film received negative reviews on release, on Rotten Tomatoes it has an approval rating of 14% based on reviews from 7 critics. Several retrospective reviews since then have given the film a more positive appraisal.

Calum Marsh of Esquire called the film "shockingly good" and said, "Inferno feels less like a Hellraiser movie than a follow-up to Jacob's Ladder (or maybe a predecessor to Silent Hill), floating dream-like through hallucinatory David Lynchian visions and downplaying plot in favor of the surreal". JoBlo.coms reviewer gave the film a seven out of ten rating, and also felt the film was not very similar to its predecessors, saying, "without a doubt the film's biggest flaw is calling itself Hellraiser". Alex DiVincenzo described the film as underrated in a review for Bloody Disgusting, and praised the films' "Lynchian surrealism" and "film noir" elements.

Sequel

References

External links 

 
 

2000 horror films
Hellraiser films
American supernatural horror films
Religious horror films
Direct-to-video horror films
Direct-to-video interquel films
Films based on works by Clive Barker
Films directed by Scott Derrickson
American direct-to-video films
2000 direct-to-video films
2000 films
Miramax films
Dimension Films films
2000 directorial debut films
2000s English-language films
2000s American films
2000s British films